Årum is a village in the north-eastern part of Fredrikstad municipality, Norway.

Villages in Østfold